Dasylirion lucidum is a  plant in the family Asparagaceae, native to the Mexican states of Oaxaca and Puebla. This is a shrub up to 2 m high, with thin, spiny-margined leaves and a scape up to 3 m tall.

References

lucidum
Flora of Oaxaca
Flora of Mexico
Flora of Puebla